Jose Mari Kaimo (born January 21, 1960, in Manila, Philippines) is a veteran Filipino journalist, news anchor, host, television personality, actor, and voice-over artist.

Career 
Kaimo started as a news reporter at the height of the Ferdinand Marcos dictatorship. After the EDSA People Power Revolution, he anchored various newscasts on different TV stations including People's Television Network, GMA Network, ABS-CBN, and Studio 23.

He co-hosted for Vilma Santos' show Vilma! in 1989, and some years later, shows such as The Global Filipino on TFC and The Correspondents on ABS-CBN. Kaimo also anchored News Central on Studio 23 from its inception in September 1998 until June 2007.

since 2007, he is currently one of the regular hosts of the television program The 700 Club Asia, the Philippine franchise of the American program of the same name produced by CBN Asia.

Kaimo is also a voice-over artist, who narrated for some advertisements and AVPs.

He's been writing Christian apologetics posts in his blog site, ApoLogika in 2013.

Kaimo pursued an acting career in late 2016, where he mostly appeared in ABS-CBN and sometimes GMA.

Filmography

As a news anchor and host 

 News on 4 – PTV
 (1992–98) GMA Network News – GMA Network
 (1989) Vilma! – GMA Network
 (1991) 5th PMPC Star Awards for Television – IBC
 The Correspondents – ABS-CBN
 The Global Filipino – TFC
 (1998–2007) News Central – Studio 23
 (2000) Himig Handog sa Bayaning Pilipino – ABS-CBN
 (2007–present) The 700 Club Asia – Q/GMA News TV/GMA Network

As a television actor

As a voice-over 

 PruLife UK: “The Stubborn Man” advertisement (2014)
 Bangko Sentral: “New Money” advertisement series
 PhilDev USA (formerly the Ayala Foundation USA) advertisement/AVP
 Neurobion: "True Heroes" (2020)

References

External links 

 
 
 

1960 births
Living people
Filipino male television actors
Filipino television news anchors
Filipino television evangelists
De La Salle University alumni
GMA Integrated News and Public Affairs people
ABS-CBN News and Current Affairs people
ABS-CBN personalities
GMA Network personalities
People's Television Network
Filipino male voice actors